This is a list of geothermal springs in the United Kingdom, otherwise known as warm springs and hot springs (defined as those hotter than 37 degrees C):

England
Bakewell British Legion 
Bakewell Recreation Ground 
Bath 
Beresford Dale, River Dove 
Bradwell Spring 
Crich, Meerbrook Sough, Leashaw Farm 
Crich, Ridgeway Sough, Whatstandwell 
Cross Bath, Bath, Somerset 
Droitwich Spa, Worcestershire 
The Hetling Spring, Bath, Somerset 
Hotwells, Bristol 
The King's Bath, Bath, Somerset 
Lower Dimindale, Derbyshire 
Matlock, Derbyshire Thermal springs 
St Ann's Well, Buxton, Derbyshire 
Stall Street Fountain, Bath, Somerset 
Stoke Sough, Grindleford  
Stoney Middleton

Wales
Taff's Well Thermal Spring, Rhondda Cynon Taff, South Wales

See also
 List of spa towns in the United Kingdom

References

External links
 Thermal springs in Derbyshire
 Map of monitored waters in Bath
 Historic temperatures of some springs in Bath
 Description of Stoney Middleton Thermal Spring

 
Geothermal springs
Geothermal springs